The Tripura Baptist Christian Union (TBCU) is a Baptist Christian denomination in Tripura, India. It has its head office in Agartala, the state capital. The TBCU is affiliated to the Asia Pacific Baptist Federation (APBF) and the Baptist World Alliance (BWA). It is also a member church in the North East India Christian Council (NEICC), a regional church body of the National Council of Churches in India (NCCI). As of 2020, TBCU had 84,795 members in 943 churches.

History

The union was formed under the leadership of Rev. M.J. Eade in December 1938 in Lakshmilunga, a village six miles from Agartala.
TBCU was supported and funded from the beginning by the New Zealand Baptist Missionary Society (NZBMS) and they provided most of the staff till the 1960s. Since then TBCU has now become an independent indigenous self-supporting church organisation. Rev. M.J. Eade was appointed as the first General Secretary of the Tripura Baptist Christian Union. Rev. Lalhuala Darlong was the first national General Secretary.

TBCU employs many pastors and evangelists and runs community programs such as schools and dispensaries.
Since the early 80s, it has been working in partnerships with the Baptist Church of Mizoram (BCM) and also with the Evangelical Church of Maraland (ECM) from Mizoram. Both BCM and ECM have many workers in Tripura working as missionaries and evangelist/teachers in various TBCU churches and schools.

TBCU celebrated its Golden jubilee and Diamond Jubilees in 1988 and 1998 respectively with much fanfare.

Organization

Office
TBCU has its office in the Baptist Mission Compound at Arundhutinagar, Agartala.

The Mission Compound was established in 1938 under an official land grant by the then King of Tripura Kingdom, Maharaja Bir Bikram Kishore Manikya, to the Baptist missionaries from New Zealand.

Associations
It has the following affiliated associations:

Sadar North Baptist Association (SNBA)
Central Baptist Association (CBA)
Kok Baptist Association (KOKBA)
Udaipur Baptist Association (UBA)
Salgra Baptist Association (SBA)
Kailashahar Baptist Christian Association (KBCA)
Jampui Sakhan Baptist Association (JSBA)
Tripura Baptist A'chik Krima
Yarong Baptist Christian Association (YBCA)
Saisawm Sazai Baptist Association (SSBA)
Dharmanagar-Longai Baptist Association (DLBA)
Yapri Baptist Association (YBA)
Kamalpur Baptist Association (KBA)
Songang Baptist Christian Association (SBCA)
Dergang Baptist Association (DBA)
Jampui Longai Baptist Association (JLBA)
Hachwk Haphar Baptist Association(HHBA)

Every year a meeting of the Council Members of the TBCU is organised at one of the churches within the Union.

Schools

Union

St. Paul's School

The TBCU runs the St. Paul's School which is situated in Arundhutinagar, Agartala. The school was started in the early 1940s as the first English medium school in the Kingdom of Tripura.

Currently, the Principal of School is Mrs Manjuri Sangma and the Vice-Principal is Mr. James Muankima.

The school is a higher secondary school with classes from K.G. to Class XII. It is affiliated to CISCE. There are more than 1500 students.

Darchawi S.B Bengali medium school, at Darchawi village in Unakoti district of Tripura, was also developed by the NZBMS with the financial aid of the Government of Tripura.

SNBA
The association runs four English Medium schools, namely:

Yakhili Academy
Yakhili Academy is a Higher Secondary school in Khumulwng affiliated to TBSE.

Tipprah Academy
Tipprah Academy is a high school in Barkathal affiliated to the TBSE.

Salka Academy
Salka Academy is in Hezamara

Pohor Academy
Pohor Academy is in Burakha

CBA

St. Peter's School
St Peter's School is located in Jampuijala Block, Sepahijala District of Tripura and is run by the Central Baptist Association of TBCU. It was established in 1991.

KOKBA

Kok English Medium School
Kok English Medium School is located in Baijal bari, Khowai District. The school is affiliated to TBSE for Nursey to Class -X. It is run by KOKBA.

Udaipur Baptist Association(UBA)

St. John's Senior Secondary School

St John's High School is located in Raio, Killa, Udaipur, Gomoti Tripura. It was established in 1972. The school is affiliated to CBSE for Nursery to Class -XII. It is run by Borok Hoda Thong(BHT).

Elem English School

Elem English School is located in Dulukma, Amarpur, Gomoti Tripura . The school is affiliated to TBSE for Nursery to Class -X . It is run by Baptist Church of Mizoram(BCM).

Hamari English School

Hamari English School is located in Bangphur, Amarpur, Gomati Tripura. The school is affiliated to TBSE for Nursery to Class-VIII .It is also run by BCM.

Nograi Mission English School

Nograi Mission English School(NMES) is located is located in Nograi, Ompi, Gomoti Tripura . The school is affiliated to CBSE for Nursery to Class -VIII .It is run by Chekiye Village Baptist Church(CVBC), Nagaland.

Salgra Baptist Association(SBA)

Ebenezer High School
Ebenezer High School is located in Twiphuma, Manubazar,South Tripura District of Tripura. It was established in 1983. The school is affiliated to Central Board of Secondary Education (CBSE).

Saisawm Sazai Baptist Association (SSBA)

St. James Higher Secondary School
St James Higher Secondary School is located in Gongrai Molsom village, P.O Kendraichera, Sepahijala Dist. Tripura. It was established in 1980. The school is mainly for the scheduled Tribes students. The school is affiliated to Central Board of Secondary Education For KG to Class - X and For Class - XI & XII it is affiliated to TBSE.

Nazareth English School 

Nazareth English School is Located in Tuidu Bazar, Gomati District, Tripura. Mainly For Classes for KG to Class VIII.

JSBA 
The JSBA currently runs two schools.

St. Thomas English Medium School
St. Thomas English Medium School, located at Vanghmun village, was established in 1979. It educates to the mostly scheduled Tribes students living in and around Jampui hill. Pu Lalnunsanga is the headmaster of the school. The school has KG to Class X standards. The school is affiliated to the Tripura Board of School education (TBSE). Every year a considerable number of Madhyamik students appear for their examination and come out with flying colors. The school has contributed greatly to the educational development of the people of Jampui hill. It has a boarding house for both male and female students. A stipend is provided by the Tribal Welfare Department of Tripura, through which each year a number of poor students can pursue their educational careers at the school.

Pohor English Medium School
Pohor English Medium school was established in 2008 at Chawmanu under Chailengta Sub-Division of Dhalai District.

Theological Institution

Tripura Theological College
The TBCU runs Tripura Theological College for courses in the Bachelor of Theology (B.Th) which is accredited by the Asia Theological Association (ATA) from its mission compound in Agartala where mission workers are trained in Biblical doctrines and other theological studies. The former General Secretary of TBCU, Rev. Rajani Kaipeng is the principal of the college.

Hospital
Earlier, the TBCU ran its own hospital at their headquarters from the 1930s until 1980 when it was discontinued, providing free treatment to the people of the state.

Presently under SNBA a hospital is being constructed at Patni village of West Tripura around 20 km from Agartala city.

Social service
Since its inception. the TBCU has been supporting the several voluntary NGOs dedicated to the development of the poor tribals living in the remote hamlets of Tripura.

Institute of community transformation 
Sponsored by Seva Bharat (Mission India)
Location: Madhab Baptist Church, Mandwi Baptist Pastoral Circle

Publications

Bibles 
TBCU in partnership with the Bible Society of India has been active in translating the Bible and New Testament in various local languages of Tripura.

Smai Kwtal 
The New Testament of the Bible in Kokborok language, the dialect of the native people of Tripura was first published in 1976.

The translation team were:
 Rev. B.K. Smith, NZBMS
 Rev. Jong Bahadur Debbarma, TBCU
 Ramesh Debbarma, TBCU

Baibel Kthar
The Bible in Kaubru dialect for the Bru people called Bible kthar that is meaning Holy Bible. The New Testament called SMAIKTA and the OLD Testament called SMAIKCHAM. 
The translation by Rev. S.K. MSHA, and his team which was published by the Bible Society of India in 2011.

Baibel Kwthar 
The full Holy Bible in Kokborok language was published for the first time in 2013 by the Bible Society of India.

The TBCU translation team were:
 Rev. Jong Bahadur Debbarma, CBA
 Rev. Anil Debbarma, CBA
 Rev. Nilmani Debbarma, SNBA
 Mark Debbarma, CBA
 Chitta Debbarma, SNBA
 Dn. Chitta Ranjan Debbarma, SNBA

Dan Thar 
The New Testament of the Bible in (Molsom) language the dialect of the native people of Tripura.
The translation team were:
 Rev.Misilkumar Molsom
 Rev.Sonabahadur Molsom
 Decon. Lalkunga Molsom
 Decon.CL.Nunhlima

Literature 
Under the Tripura Baptist Christian Literature Committee and the Kokborok Christian Literature Committee (KCLC) various songbooks, tracts and study materials are regularly published by the TBCU.

Statistics 
TBCU has 943 churches with a total communicant membership of more than 98,000.

Office bearers of TBCU

Union
 General Secretary: Rev. Rantuasanga Darlong
 Associate General Secretary: Rev. Kishore Debbarma 
 Secretary: Rev. Lalthanliana

Presidents
The list of presidents of the Union are as follows:

Sadar North Baptist Association (SNBA)
Pastors of SNBA
 Rev. C. K. Debbarma (General Secretary, TBCU)
 Rev. Ranjit Debbarma (Executive Secretary, SNBA)
  Rev.Chandramoni Debbarma (Secretary, Sadar North Baptist Association)
 Rev. Nilmani Debbarma
 Rev. Biswa Kr. Debbarma
 Pastor Mangal Debbarma
 Pastor Manmohan Debbarma
 Pastor Barendra Debbarma (Shillong)
 Pastor Samendra Debbarma 
 Evan. Shikha Debbarma
 Pastor Ajit Debbarma
 Pastor Sitaram Rupini
 Pastor Sushanta Debbarma
 Pastor Pradip Debbarma
 Pastor Mantu Debbarma
 Pastor Kishore Debbarma
 Pastor Bijoy Debbarma
 Pastor Ratan Debbarma
 Pastor Sukuram Debbarma
 Pastor Nripendra Debbarma
 Pastor Partha Sarathi Debbarma
 Pastor Sandhyaram Debbarma
 Pastor Rajkumar Debbarma
 Pastor Mithun Rupini 
 Pastor Biswajit Debbarma
 Pastor Nitya Debbarma
 Pastor Brajendra Debbarma
 Pastor Manoranjan Debbarma
 Pastor Kishore (Yarwng) Debbarma
 Pastor Arun Debbarma
 Pastor Ajendra Debbarma 
 Pastor Rwngthoma Debbarma
 Pastor Joseph Debbarma
 Pastor Manik Debbarma
 Pastor Somchati Debbarma
 Pastor Sunil Debbarma
 Pastor Malendra Debbarma
 Pastor Debojit Debbarma
 Pastor Sachin Debbarma
 Pastor Bijoy Debbarma
 Evan Amit Debbarma
 Evan Bishu kr Debbarma
 Evan Bharat Debbarma
 Evan Miss Ganga Debbarma
 E/T John Rupini
 E/T Siari Debbarma
 E/T Subasish Debbarma
E/T Jico Debbarma
 Mr. Rabindra Debbarma (Driver)
Office Staff of SNBA
 Mr. Pitor Debbarma (Accountant)
Ordained Evangelists of SNBA
 Ord. Evan. Lalnunsiama (BCM Missionary)
 Ord. Evan. Lalchungnunga (JSBA Missionary)

Central Baptist Association (CBA)
Pastors of CBA
The pastors of the CBA are:
 Rev. Jong Bahadur Debbarma (Retd)
 Rev. Asit Debbarma (Retd)
 Rev. Swapan Debbarma
 Rev. Surajit Debbarma
 Rev. Mohan Koloi
 Rev. Anil Debbarma (Retd)
 Rev. Ajit Debbarma
 Rev. Tripureswer Debbarma
 Rev. Sambhuram Debbarma
 Rev. Swadesh Debbarma
 Rev. Abiram Debbarma
Ordained Evangelists of CBA
 Ord. Evan. Aprajit Debbarma
 Ord. Evan. Sushil Debbarma
 Ord.Evan. Ranjit Debbarma
 Ord.Evan. Madhab Debbarma
 Ord.Evan. Satyaram Debbarma

Evangelists of CBA
 Evan. Dilip Debbarma
 Evan. Premananda Debbarma
 Evan. Laxman Debbarma
 Evan. Ranjan Debbarma  
 Evan. Krishna Debbarma
 Evan. Bitta Debbarma
 Evan. Uttam Debbarma
 Evan. Saitya Debbarma
 Evan. Arup Debbarma

Kok Baptist Association (KOKBA)

Pastors of KOKBA
The pastors of the KOKBA are:
 Rev. Jyotirmoy Debbarma
 Rev. Sunil Debbarma
 Rev. Malendra Debbarma

 Rev. Surnapada Jamatia
 Rev. Dharmendra Debbarma
 Rev. Samaresh Debbarma

Ordained Evangelists of KOKBA
 Dhiman Debbarma

Ordained Evangelists of KOKBA
 Evan. Philip Rupini
 Evan. Kishore Debbarma
 Evan. Manoj Kumar Debbarma
 Evan. Sanjoy Debbarma
 Evan. Ranju Debbarma
 Evan. Utpal Debbarma
 Evan. Biresh Debbarma
 Evan. Mansujit Debbarma
 Evan pradesh Debbarma

Udaipur Baptist Association (UBA)
The pastors of the UBA are:
 Rev. Debguru Jamatia
 Rev. Subraihamjak Jamatia
 Rev. Chandra Bahadur Jamatia

Ordained Evangelists of UBA
 Ord. Evan. Imangrai Jamatia
 Ord. Evan. Abraham Jamatia
 Ord. Evan. Uttam Kr. Jamatia
 Ord. Evan. Phaijak Jamatia

Evangelists of UBA
 Evan. Jiban Barma Jamatia
 Evan. Swlaijak Jamatia
 Evan. Nabin Chandra Jamatia
 Evan. Swapan Jamatia
 Evan. Bijoy Kumar Jamatia
 Evan. Bipad Sadhan Jamatia
 Evan. Baibel Kalai

Saisawm Sazai Baptist Association (SSBA)
SSBA pastors

Rev.Porimol Kaipeng (ES)
Rev.Sidhantorai Molsom
Rev.Dumbumuni Hrangkhawl
O/E Neilutlian Kaipeng
O/E Lalpanliana Molsom

SSBA workers
Dulirai Molsom
Mosia Molsom
Chondrolal Molsom
Vanlalnghaka Kuki
Romedas Molsom
Temlongir Hrangkhawl
Joykumar Kaipeng
David Lalthangliana Kaipeng
Purnibasi Molsom

List of churches affiliated to TBCU

Sadar North Baptist Association (SNBA)

Abhicharan Baptist Pastoral Circle 

 Kisong (1973)
 Dofidar (1977)
 Rajghat (1977)
 Durga Choudhury Kami (1982)
 Abhicharan (1983)*

 Wala Kami (1983)
 Lefunga (1987)
 Sadhiram (1988)
 Kainta Kwpra (1990)
 Habildar (1990)

 Twisa Kwthang (1992)
 Mokam (1993)
 Bokjur (2002)
 Twisa Kwchang (2006)
 Rojong (2006)

 Kumaribil (2006)
 Phota Kami (2007)
 Raikanai (2008)
 Raj Chantai (2010)
 Kanto Kwpra (2010)
 Maikhor (2012)

Borkathal Baptist Pastoral Circle 

 Debra (1978)
 Boiragi (1980)
 Borkathal (1986)
 Doigola (1987)
 Belphang (1987)

 Bargachia (1988)
 Khwichang (1988)
 Patni (1989)
 Yacharai (1991)
 Tokmakari (1994)

 Hathai Kwchang (2005)
 Chakhuma (2006)
 Khampar (2007)
 Bag Kami (2008)
 Radhanagar (2008)

 Salka (2010)
 Dugurai 
 Urua Kami (2012)
 Twibru

Champaknagar Baptist Pastoral Circle 

 Khamting (1971)
 Bhrigudas (1977)
 Joynagar (1988)
 Jangalia (1988)
 Goyacharan (1989)
 Kulang Thagu (2013)

 Sobhamani (1990)
 Sinai Kami (1991)
 Maharam Sardar (1993)
 Hamari (1993)
 Rasu (1994)
 Rangking 

 Sarat Sardar (1995)
 Roktia (1997)
 Debra (1999)
 Lalit Mohan (1999)
 Chokhreng (2003)
 Borduar

 Waraitwisa (2004)
 Duranta (2005)
 Uakjara (2005)
 Chandra Sadhu (2006)
 Immanuel (2007)

 Mang Kanto (2008)
 Rabicharan Thakur (2010)
 Nareng (2010)
 Thastwi Hatai (2011)
 Sambhusadhu (2012)

Dakdu Baptist Pastoral Circle 

 Binon Kwpra (1975)
 Bhuban Chantai (1979)
 Madhab (1980)
 Sonamoni Sipai (1983)
 New Testament (1984)

 Boidya Kwpra (1986)
 Ramchandra (1990)
 Sibram (1998)
 Sridam Kwpra (1999)
 Chamathwi (2007)

 Sikwrai Kwpra (2007)
 Badramisip (2008)
 Thang Kami (2008)
 Lamkwthar (2010)
 Burakha (2010)

 Aitorma 
 Kha Kwtal (2014)
 Boirwng

Hezamara Baptist Pastoral Circle 

 Hezamara (1994)
 Garing Kami (1994)
 Shankhola (1995)
 Doldoli (1998)
 Chandranath (2003)

 Hasing Auar (2005)
 Matia (2006)
 Sonaram Industry (2008)
 Twisa Kuphur (2009)
 Bargatha (2010)

 Ganthalwng 
 Dagia

Jamilwng Baptist Pastoral Circle 

 Bagbari (1978)
 Bhati Fatik Cherra (1987)
 Agartala City (1988)
 Singlwng (1990)
 Gangalwng (1993)

 Jamilwng (1995)
 Kami Kwtal (1997)
 Hamari (2003)
 Khakotor (2004)
 Sipai (2006)

 Khampar kami (2008)
 Pohor (2009)
 Gamsa Kwpra (2010)
 Naran Kami

Khumulwng Baptist Pastoral Circle 

 Kalasati (1976)
 Zion (1983)
 Dashram (1985)
 Joygobind (1986)
 Khutamura (1987)

 Khakchangma (1988)
 Sukia Kwpra (1988)
 Muichingor (1990)
 Chhoigoria (1990)
 Birchandra (1996)

 Bardhaman Thakur (1997)
 Khumulwng (1998)
 Rangchak (2000)
 Langma (2005)
 Dula Kwpra (2005)

 Khasrang (2006)
 Galili (2007)
 Mohan Kwpra (2008)
 Kandra (2008)
 Immanuel (2010)

 Bas Kwpra (2013)
 Rambuk (2014)
 Kandra

Mandwi Baptist Pastoral Circle 

 Thaiplok Phang (1977)
 Manikung (1978)
 Matham (1983)
 Mandwi (1986)
 Udai Kwpra (1987)

 Bishram (1989)
 Khengrai (1989)
 Sat Para (1996)
 Nepal Mura (1996)
 Naba Chandra (1997)

 Begram (1999)
 Lakhan Kwpra (2000)
 Bethel (2000)
 Baludum (2005)

 Hachwk Madhab (2007)
 Kanta Kobra (2009)
 Nolbogola (2009)
 Dondra (2015)

 Kherengbar (2010)
 Chhoigoria (2010)
 Chairgoria (2013)
 Emau (2013)
 Bokhiri (2013)

Central Baptist Association (CBA)

Bishramganj Baptist Pastoral Circle 

 Borkur (1960)
 Morgang (1970)
 Ramnagar (1974)
 Amtali (1979)
 Herma (1989)
 Rangmala (1991)
 Golirai (1991)
 Sutarmura (1992)
 Bishramganj (1994)
 Twichang (1995)

 Latia Chharra (1996)
 Pagli (2000)
 Monai Khar (2000)
 Hirapur (2000)
 Twibokhorok (2001)
 Sreehari (2001)
 Tokturma (2001)
 Jagukhar (2002)
 Nukhung Rasa (2002)
 Hathai Kwchak (2003)

 Santaram (2006)
 Chikan Chhara (2007)
 Maharam

 Rangchak

City Baptist Pastoral Circle 

 City (2001)
 Modhupur (2006)

Gabardi Baptist Pastoral Circle 

 Dundrai (1989)
 Shyamnagar (1990)
 Jong (1992)
 Berja (1993)
 Bethel (1995)
 Bharat Sardar (2006)
 Ramgati (2006)
 Sambhu Charan (2006)
 Bahumani (2006)
 Salom (1996)
 Kanchanmala (1997)

 Khabaksa (2000)
 Pohor (2000)
 Gabardi (2001)
 Konai (2005)
 Dhukhia Kwpra (2006)
 Hari Mangal (2006)
 Satukura (2007)
 Harihari (2008)
 Ramanadh (2008)
 Khama Berjo (2008)

 Kha Swrang (2008)
 Dhupchara (2010)
 Hari Jamadar (2005)
 Bhabania

Jampui Baptist Pastoral Circle 

 Morgang East (1979)
 Nabasardar (1987)
 Gahiram (1988)
 Gurudayal (1988)
 Boiragi (1989)
 Thelakung (1990)
 Bahatur (1993)
 Jampuijala Block (1997)
 Jelua (2002)
 Jampui Hati (2003)
 Getsimani (2005)

 Muitu (2006)
 Twisarangchak (2006)
 Sombar Hati (2006)
 Suarikhola (2006)
 Muni Chandra (2007)
 Ram Sardar (2007)
 Saka Nimai (2008)
 Twithaiplok (2008)
 Sankatram (2008)

 3 No Colony (2009)
 Suari Khola

Takarjala Baptist Pastoral Circle 

 Kamichang (1986)
 Takarjala (1986)
 Ganjamara (1987)
 Pekuarjala (1990)
 Bokhri (1994)
 Kandram (1998)
 Sampaijak (1998)
 Phantok (1999)
 Twijlang (1999)
 Jangalia (2002)

 Paliabanga (2005)
 Thastwi (2005)
 Gangahari (2005)
 Kherthakur (2007)
 Debendra (2008)
 Hiramanta (2009)
 Nazareth (2009)
 Khakwtal (2009)
 Arjun Thakur (2008)
 Bethlehem (2010)

 Bethany

Udaipur Baptist Association (UBA)

Amarpur Baptist Pastoral Circle 

 Dulukma (1980)
 Gorjung(1980)
 Nograi (1988)
 Bangphur (1988)
 Khakchang (1989)
 Koroimura (1990)
 Kasko (1990)
 Shalom (1990)
 Paithak (1992)

 Dugri (1992)
 Sonkhala (1992)
 Tingoria (1995)
 Golgatha (1999)
 Horeb (1997)
 Twijlang (2000)
 Adongkha (2001)
 Kashi Podo (2009)
 Rambadra (2010)

 Mayunguarai (2000)
 Sada Radha (2007)
 Songang (2007)
 Twibaglai (2009)
 Ompi Regrouping Colony (2009)
 Sesua Colony (2010)
 Jarikosom
 Gongia
 Noloni

 Hodrai
 Garjung Phang 
 Chwla kaham
 Dalak
 Salka
 Khajur
 Raima(2018)

Marandi Baptist Pastoral Circle 

 Bethel (1974)
 Songnari (1987)
 Immanuel (1988)
 Gilgal (1990)
 Hwlwighati (1992)
 Twiwandal (1993)
 Uamlwi (1994)
 Sungrung (1999)
 Gulmura (1999)

 Tiar (2000)
 Ruthai (2004)
 Twi Horchung (2005)
 Yapri Kwtal (2005)
 Ha Rangchak (2006)
 Mayung Twisa (2008)
 Tholi Bari (2008)
 Twichangma (2008)
 Twisoma (2008)
 Salka Twisikambuk (2009)

 Laiso (2009)
 Monai Panthor (2010)
 Baso (2015)
 Chundul (2016)
 Kami kwtal(2018)
 Lailwng (2019)

Pitra Baptist Pastoral Circle 

 Kuar (1972)
Manikya (1973)
 Singi Lwng (1974)
 Joying (1972)
 Hare (1979)
 Kunjomura (1979)
 Raio (1980)
 Kami Kwtal (1982)
 Hamari (1988)
 Torbang (1989)
 Saimarua (1992)

 Salem (1992)
 St. John's (1993)
 Khakchang (1996)
 Kuar Khampar (1997)
 Langma (1997)
 Khumulwng (1997)
 Maikrwisa (1997)
 Thaipong Hathai (2002)
 Kha Kuphur (2007)

 South Yalwkma (2008)
 Yalwkma(1972)
 Borchuk Hathai (2019)

Kok Baptist Association (KOKBA)

 Chandranath (1974)
 Pointram (1979)
 Moglam (1980)
 Gwngrai (1981)
 Jiten (1982)
 Madharam (1984)
 Anath Chowdhury (1985)
 Belchara (1988)
 Ghilatoli (1989)

 Basanta Kobra (1990)
 Khakchangma (1990)
 Maharani (1991)
 Thagur (1991)
 Chhanlwng (1992)
 Dophidar (1993)
 Gairing (1994)
 Sumanta (1994)
 Tagla (1994)
 Bathaka (1994)

 Chargoria (1994)
 Khowai Town (1994)
 Mosok Kami (1995)
 Bokomnia (1996)
 Yakhrai (1998)
 Bishnu Ram Sipai (1999)
 Mudilenga (1999)
 Lampra (2001)
 Monaikhor (2002)

 Kami Kwchar (2002)
 Uahlwng (2002)
 Bolitali (2003)
 Tulasikhor (2003)
 Behalabari (2003)
 Capital (2003)
 Haruaktali (2004)
 Twisa rangchak (2005)
 Baikuntho (2006)
 Balua (2006)

 Goyamphang (2006)
 Nisan (2007)
 Manik Chowdhury (2007)
 Athuk Twisa (2007)
 Mwtai Kami (2007)
 Naithok (2007)
 Tingaria (2007)
 Marchaduk (2007)
 Khaswrang (2008)
 Akhara (2009)

 Ampura (2009)
 Thailik Bwlwng (2009)
 Jalai Twisa (2009)
 Petra Kami (2009)
 Mayung kwthwi (2009)
 Tokchaya (1988)
 Sipai Hour (1992)
 Padmabil (2006)
 Harepkuar (2004)
 Mungia (1996)
 Bidhyabil (1990)

Salgra Baptist Association (SBA)

Dhanu Chowdhury Baptist Pastoral Circle 
 Dhanu Chowdhury (1977)
 Maichaya Para (1980)
 Khumtwisa (1985)
 Madab Nagar (1988)
 Emmanuel (1991)
 Matham Kami (2004)
 Hapta Para (2007)
 Betagi (2008)
 Kosomtwisa (2008)

Thailik Twisa Baptist Pastoral Circle 
 Bethel (1978)
 Banapha Para (1979)
 Taimang (1981)
 Thailik Twisa (1991)
 Rangchak (1996)
 Maira Twisa (2000)
 Twisa (2007)

Bankul Baptist Pastoral Circle 
 Zarzari (1980)
 Bankul (1984)
 Pokul (2001)
 Thaipong Twisa (2002)
 Padhamani (2007)
 Garipha (2009)
 Rosoma (2010)
 Saira (2010)
 Sabroom Town (2010)

Khakchang Baptist Pastoral Circle 
 Twiruma (1992)
 Bananta (1994)
 Khakchang (1995)
 Domdoma (1996)
 Thansa (2001)
 Monyapara (2004)
 Eden (2009)
 Akabang (2010)

Desharam Baptist Pastoral Circle 
 Twimuk (1997)
 Desharam (2003)
 New Gunjalima (2008)
 Bakmara (2008)
 Tongthokma (2010)
 Sinai (2010)

Saisawm Sazai Baptist Association

Gongrai Pastor Circle

 Gongrai (1968)              
 Bijoynandi               
 Bethlehem
 Olive
 Tangpui             
 Bethel
 Thelakung                   
 Sonarai                  
 Darkhai                      
 Tuichakma
 Dhuptoli
 Tulamura                    
 Dailonga
 Bethesda

Dewanchhora Pastor Circle
 Raio                
 Dewanchhora              
 Zawlkhaw                    
 Sonkhola                 
 Dak                          
 Darjiling
 Tutu
 Molsom Twibaklai
 Lailak Fellowship

Gamagur Pastor Circle

 Gamagur                         
 Eloi                             
 S.Colony                         
 Nelsi                            
 Marva                            
 Sonkhola                         
 Twisarangkwchak

 IBC
 Robokva
 Lungphun
 Barmachhora
 Donlekha
 Montang
 Tuicholong
 Zion

Kamlachora Pastor Circle

 Kamlachora
 Raipasa
 Hawaibari (1924)
 Monafa
 Donchhora
 Tuikoinek
 Rangamura
 Carmel
 Kalazari
 Maskumbir

Kamalpur Baptist Association (KBA)

 Maharani (1965)
 Bamanchara (1966)
 Bkhakchang (1989)
 L.T.S (1992)
 Chankap (1992)
 Mechuria (1993)
 Salthang Uatlok Twisa (1993)
 Sinai (1994)
 Kaimai (1994)

 Panbua (2001)
 Asha Purna Roaja Para (2001)
 Salem (2002)
 Dhanchandra (2005)
 Tokthu Twisa (2005)
 Mwthangnai (2005)
 Twirubam (2005)
 Pohor (2005)
 Uansukma (2006)
 Mendi (2006)

 Sion (2008)
 Kamalpur Town (2008)
 Srirampur (2008)
 Bagaishwari (2010)

Kailasahar Baptist Christian Association (KBCA)

 Joyganti (1971)
 Lalcharra (1978)
 Satarai (1988)
 Chailengta (1988)
 Khumbar Kami (1989)
 Rajkandi (1989)
 Araidrun (1989)
 Jarulcharra (1993)
 Golgotha (1993)
 Saidachhera (1996)
 Bkhaktal (1997)

 Fatikchhera (1997)
 Hamari (1999)
 Dhanbilash (1999)
 Khasrang (2000)
 Bethlehem (2005)
 Samruchhera (2007)
 Chhagaldema (2007)
 Ashinray (2007)
 Behakumar (2008)
 Kamal Charan (2008)

 Nilkumar (2008)
 Naitung Chhara (2008)
 Baganbari (2009)
 Pancham Nagar (2009)

Songang Baptist Christian Association (SBCA)

 Diliram (1962)
 Palka (1980)
 Baishyamani (1980)
 Bormura (1983)
 Smai Kwtal (1987)
 Twidu (1987)

 Sinai Kami (1990)
 Twichakma (1991)
 Bethel (1996)
 Jordan (2004)
 Hallua (2009)
 Brahmachara (2009)

Controversies
The state government of Tripura accused the organization of lending support to separatist NLFT rebels.

The Government of Tripura uncovered evidence asserting that the Baptist Church in Tripura had been helping Tripuri militants, such as the NLFT in the state. The NLFT militants, who are involved in armed struggle for the independence of Tripura, and the creation of a "Christian state", have been forcing local tribals to convert to Christianity at gunpoint and threatening to murder participants in Hindu festivals. It is believed that as many as 5,000 tribal villagers were converted in this fashion over two years. These forcible conversions to Christianity, sometimes including the use of "rape as a means of intimidation," have also been noted by academics outside of India.

The government accused the Baptist Church of Tripura for supporting this violent campaign of NLFT by providing funding and arms for the group. In April 2000, Nagmanlal Halam, Secretary of the Noapara Baptist Church in Tripura, was caught with a large quantity of explosives which were meant for the group. Halam later confessed to buying and supplying explosives to the NLFT for the past two years. Another church official, Jatna Koloi, was arrested in south Tripura in April 2000. According to the State Police, Mr Koloi had received training in guerrilla warfare at an NLFT base in 1999.

See also

 Tripuri people
 Sadar North Baptist Association
 Christianity in Tripura
 Council of Baptist Churches in Northeast India
 List of Christian denominations in North East India
 St Paul's School, Agartala
 Tripura Presbyterian Church Synod

References

External links
 www.christiantbcu.org/en/tbcu Website of TBCU
 Baptist World Alliance
 baptist.org.nz

 
Christian organizations established in 1938
Baptist denominations in India
Baptist denominations established in the 20th century
1938 establishments in India